Homochitto may refer to:
Homochitto River, a river in Mississippi
Homochitto, Issaquena County, Mississippi, a plantation in Issaquena County
Homochitto, Mississippi, an unincorporated community in Amite County
Homochitto National Forest, a national forest in Mississippi